Lukasz Kuczynski (born June 1999) is a Polish short track speed skater. He competed at the 2022 Winter Olympics, in  Mixed 2000 metre relay. He was born in Sokółka. Lukasz’s Olympic debut was at the Winter Olympics 2022 in Beijing

References

External links
 

Living people
1999 births
Polish male short track speed skaters
Olympic short track speed skaters of Poland
Short track speed skaters at the 2022 Winter Olympics
People from Sokółka